The spouse of the prime minister of Canada is the wife or husband of the prime minister of Canada. Sophie Grégoire Trudeau is the wife of the 23rd and current prime minister, Justin Trudeau.

Nineteen women have been wives of prime ministers of Canada; Kim Campbell, the only female prime minister, was unmarried during her time in office. As a semi-public figure, spouses are often present at various ceremonial, diplomatic, or partisan activities alongside the prime minister. Spouses often pursue philanthropic or charitable endeavours on their own, although the spouses have varied in how actively they sought or accepted the public spotlight.

Some media outlets have styled prime ministers' wives as the "first lady of Canada", similar to the style of first lady used in the neighbouring United States and other republics. This is not a recognized nor accurately applicable title, as both the spouses of Canada's monarch and that of the governor general take precedence over a prime minister's spouse. Rather, use of first lady is based on the influence of American media and a general misunderstanding of Canadian civics.

Public role
The prime minister is not the head of state; thus, their spouse does not officially play as active a role in Canadian affairs as do the royal and viceregal consorts. The prime minister's spouse, however, is still generally regarded as a public or semi-public figure, frequently accompanying the prime minister on campaign and other public appearances, and often hosting dignitaries at the prime minister's residence.

At times, prime ministers' spouses have used their public status to promote charitable causes: Mila Mulroney was a spokesperson for the Canadian Cystic Fibrosis Foundation and other children's charities, Aline Chrétien was an active campaigner for literacy programs, and Laureen Harper was known for her support of animal welfare organizations such as the Ottawa Humane Society. 

Many have also held an unofficial but influential role as a political or campaign advisor to their husbands: Laureen Harper was considered her husband's "secret weapon", whose instinctive sense of campaign optics proved invaluable to her husband's career; Harper, for example, was credited as the brains behind a public appearance in which her husband, Prime Minister Stephen Harper, appeared on stage at Ottawa's National Arts Centre to sing the Beatles' "With a Little Help from My Friends", which was widely perceived as softening the prime minister's somewhat stiff and bureaucratic public image. Despite her relatively low public profile, Aline Chrétien was also recognized as a powerful advisor to her husband; Maclean's magazine once wrote, "Never mind calling her the power behind the throne—she shares the seat of power", and columnist Allan Fotheringham later called her the second most powerful political figure in Canada, behind her husband but ahead of any elected member of Parliament or any staffer in the Prime Minister's Office.

Some prime ministers' spouses have also attracted attention for other reasons: Maryon Pearson was noted for her prickly wit, having made a number of famous quips which are still regularly featured in anthologies of famous quotations. Margaret Trudeau, whom Pierre Trudeau married while in office, became a notable celebrity in her own right, most famously when she was featured on the covers of international tabloids after being seen partying at Studio 54. Maureen McTeer, spouse of Joe Clark, attracted controversy when she became the first spouse of a prime minister to retain her own surname after marriage. Mila Mulroney also rose to some notoriety due to her spending habits, and was satirized in Frank as Imelda because of her purportedly large collection of shoes.

Because the role of a prime minister's spouse is not formally defined, however, a spouse may face criticism over her public visibility itself. In 2016, Sophie Grégoire Trudeau faced some controversy when she stated in an interview that she needed a staff assistant to keep on top of all the requests she received for public and charitable appearances, which some critics described as coming from a sense of personal entitlement or an attempt to turn herself into a First Lady.

Other notes
Canada has had two prime ministers who were bachelors, William Lyon Mackenzie King and R.B. Bennett. Mackenzie Bowell, a widower whose wife, Harriet, died in 1884, was also not married during his term in office. Pierre Trudeau began his term as a bachelor, became the first Canadian prime minister to get married while in office and ended it as Canada's first divorced prime minister.

Three other Canadian prime ministers–Alexander Mackenzie, John Diefenbaker, and John A. Macdonald—were widowers who remarried before becoming prime minister. Macdonald, Canada's first prime minister, had been a widower for ten years while in office in the former Province of Canada. His first wife was Isabella Clark, who died in 1857. Macdonald married his second wife, Agnes Bernard, while in London in 1867, during the final negotiations leading up to Confederation. Mackenzie's first wife was Helen Neil, and Diefenbaker's was Edna Brower.

Canada has also had one female prime minister, Kim Campbell. As she had finalized her divorce from her second husband, Howard Eddy, in early 1993, there has never been a male spouse of the prime minister (although Campbell's first husband, Nathan Divinsky, did try to attract media attention in 1993 by billing himself as the ex-husband of the prime minister). She briefly dated Gregory Lekhtman, the inventor of Exerlopers, during her term as prime minister, but kept the relationship private and did not involve him in the 1993 election campaign. In 1997, after her prime ministership, she entered into a common-law marriage with Hershey Felder.

Maureen McTeer maintained a career during her life at 24 Sussex; although several others have had independent careers prior to their spouse's term as prime minister, all others have put their own careers on hold to concentrate on the public and ceremonial and philanthropic aspects of their role as a leader's spouse. McTeer was also the only spouse of a prime minister to use her birth surname, rather than her husband's surname, in her public life; although Laureen (Teskey) Harper and Sophie Grégoire Trudeau both used their birth surnames prior to their husbands becoming prime ministers, both opted to minimize any controversy by using their husband's surname once they were elevated to the public role of a prime minister's spouse. Grégoire Trudeau did, however, become the first spouse of a prime minister to use her husband's surname with her own.

Spouses of the prime ministers

See also
 List of royal consorts of Canada
 Viceregal consort of Canada

References

 
Canada